The Lord Culpeper Hotel is a historic hotel building at 401 South Main Street in downtown Culpeper, Virginia.  It is a three-story brick building with Colonial Revival features, including round-arch windows on the ground floor, a columned entry portico, and a projecting modillioned cornice.  It was built in 1936, and for many years it was the town's only hotel.  It served local travelers until the 1970s.

The hotel was listed on the National Register of Historic Places in 1984.

See also
National Register of Historic Places listings in Culpeper County, Virginia

References

Hotels in Virginia
National Register of Historic Places in Culpeper County, Virginia
Buildings and structures in Culpeper County, Virginia
Drinking establishments on the National Register of Historic Places in Virginia